The consensus 1952 College Basketball All-American team, as determined by aggregating the results of five major All-American teams.  To earn "consensus" status, a player must win honors from a majority of the following teams: the Associated Press, Look Magazine, The United Press International, Collier's Magazine and the International News Service.

1952 Consensus All-America team

Individual All-America teams

AP Honorable Mention:

 Jesse Arnelle, Penn State
 Ernie Beck, Penn
 John Clune, Navy
 Walter Dukes, Seton Hall
 Tom Gola, La Salle
 Frank Guisness, Washington
 Don Johnson, Oklahoma A&M
 Johnny Kerr, Illinois
 Bob Lochmueller, Louisville
 Earle Markey, Holy Cross
 Carl McNulty, Purdue
 Bill Mlkvy, Temple
 Dwane Morrison, South Carolina
 Bob Sassone, St. Bonaventure
 Don Schlundt, Indiana
 Frank Selvy, Furman
 Glen Smith, Utah
 Jim Tucker, Duquesne
 Bobby Watson, Kentucky

See also
 1951–52 NCAA men's basketball season

References

NCAA Men's Basketball All-Americans
All-Americans